β-Carbon nitride (beta-carbon nitride), β-C3N4, is a superhard material predicted to be harder than diamond.

The material was first proposed in 1985 by Amy Liu and Marvin L. Cohen. Examining the nature of crystalline bonds they theorised that carbon and nitrogen atoms could form a particularly short and strong bond in a stable crystal lattice in a ratio of 1:1.3, and that this material could be harder than diamond.

Nanosized crystals and nanorods of β-carbon nitride can be prepared by mechanochemical processing.

Production

Processing 
β-C3N4 can be synthesized in a mechanochemical reaction. This method involves ball milling of high-purity graphite powders down to an amorphous nanoscale size under an argon atmosphere. Then argon is replaced by an NH3 gas atmosphere, which helps to form nanosized flake-like β-C3N4. During ball milling, fracture and welding of the reactants and graphite powder particles occur repeatedly from ball/powder collisions. Plastic deformation of the graphite powder particles occur due to the shear bands decomposing into sub-grains that are separated by low-angle grain boundaries, further milling decreases the sub-grain size until nanosize sub-grains form. The high pressure and intense motion promotes catalytic dissociation of NH3 molecules into monatomic nitrogen on the fractured surface of the carbon. Nanosized carbon powders act substantially different from its bulk material as a result of particle dimension and surface area, causing the nanosized carbon to easily react with the free nitrogen atoms, forming β-C3N4 powder.

Producing nanorods 
Single crystal β-C3N4 nanorods can be formed after the powder-like or flake-like compound is thermally annealed with an NH3 gas flow. The size of the nanorods is determined by the temperature and time of thermal annealing. These nanorods grow faster in their axis direction than the diameter direction and have hemispherical-like ends. A cross section of the nanorods indicates that their section morphology is prismatic. It was discovered that they contain amorphous phases, however when annealed to 450 °C  for three hours under an NH3 atmosphere, the amount of the amorphous phase diminished to almost none. These nanorods are dense and twinned rather than nanotubes. Synthesizing these nanorods through thermal annealing provides an effective, low-cost, high-yield method for the synthesis of single crystal nanorods.

Alternate methods of synthesis 
Rather than forming a powder or nanorod, the carbon nitride compound can alternatively be formed in thin amorphous films by either shock-wave compression technology, pyrolysis of high nitrogen content precursors, diode sputtering, solvothermal preparation, pulsed laser ablation, or ion implantation.

Difficulties of processing 
Although extensive studies on the process and synthesis of the formed carbon nitride have been reported, the nitrogen concentration of the compound tends to be below the ideal composition for C3N4. This is due to the low thermodynamic stability with respect to carbon phases and N2 gas, indicated by a positive value of the enthalpies of formation. The commercial exploitation of nanopowders is very limited by the high synthesis cost along with difficult methods of production that causes a low yield.

Characteristics

Morphology
β-C3N4 has the same crystal structure as β-Si3N4 with a hexagonal network of tetrahedrally (sp3) bonded carbon and trigonal planar nitrogen (sp2). Thermal annealing can be used to change the crystal morphology from flake-like into sphere- or rod-like structures. The nanorods are generally straight and contain no other defects.

Properties 
A hardness equal or above that of diamond (the hardest known material) has been predicted, but not yet demonstrated.

See also 
 Graphitic carbon nitride
 Heterodiamond
 Superhard materials

References

Nitrides
Superhard materials